Stark County Courthouse can refer to:

 Stark County Courthouse (North Dakota) in Dickinson
 Stark County Courthouse (Ohio) in Canton